The San Angelo Bronchos were a West Texas League baseball team based in San Angelo, Texas, United States that played in 1921 and 1922. They were the first professional baseball team to ever come out of San Angelo, Texas.

In 1921, they went 69-59, finishing third in the league. They finished sixth in the league in 1922.

References

.

Defunct minor league baseball teams
Sports in San Angelo, Texas
1921 establishments in Texas
1922 disestablishments in Texas
Sports clubs disestablished in 1922
Baseball teams established in 1921
Defunct baseball teams in Texas
Baseball teams disestablished in 1922